Eliza Nelson, née Eliza Mendonca, is an Indian field hockey player and a former captain of the women's national field hockey team of India. Born in a Goan family on 27 September 1956 at Pune in the Indian state of Maharashtra, Nelson played for the Indian Railways and led the Indian national team that won the gold medal at the 9th Asian Games held at New Delhi in 1982. She was also a member of the team that secured fourth place at the Moscow 1980 Summer Olympics. She received the Arjuna Award in 1981 and the Government of India awarded her the fourth highest Indian civilian honour of Padma Shri in 1983.

See also

 India women's national field hockey team
 1980 Summer Olympics
 1982 Asian Games

References

External links

Recipients of the Padma Shri in sports
1956 births
Goan Catholics
Field hockey players from Pune
Recipients of the Arjuna Award
Olympic field hockey players of India
Indian female field hockey players
Field hockey players at the 1980 Summer Olympics
Living people
Sportswomen from Maharashtra
20th-century Indian women
20th-century Indian people
Asian Games medalists in field hockey
Field hockey players at the 1982 Asian Games
Asian Games gold medalists for India
Medalists at the 1982 Asian Games